Gogrial Airport is an airport in South Sudan.

Location and layout
Gogrial Airport  is located in Gogrial West County, Gogrial State, in the town of Gogrial, near the borders with the Republic of Sudan and the Abyei Region. The airport is located within the central business district of the town.

The geographic coordinates of this airport are: 8° 32' 24.00"N, 28° 06' 0.00"E (Latitude: 8.8670; Longitude: 28.1170). The airport has a single unpaved runway, which is expected to be turned into a taxiway as the airport expands with a new runway and passenger terminal facility.

Overview
Gogrial Airport is a small civilian airport that serves the town of Gogrial and surrounding communities. There are no scheduled airline flights to Gogrial Airport at this time.

See also
 List of airports in South Sudan
 Warrap (state)

References

External links
Location of Gogrial Airport At Google Maps

Airports in South Sudan
Warrap (state)
Bahr el Ghazal